Sarılı Xəştab is a village in the Zangilan Rayon of Azerbaijan.

References

Populated places in Zangilan District